iDEAL is e-commerce payment system used for online banking in the Netherlands. The payment platform was first introduced to consumers in 2005 and gained notoriety in 2014 when it claimed 54% of all Dutch online payments. 

Currence Weblink 

iDEAL is an online payment method that enables consumers to pay online through their own bank. In addition to webshops, other organisations that are not part of the e-commerce market also offer iDEAL. iDEAL is increasingly used to pay energy bills, make donations to charities, buy mobile credits, pay local taxes, traffic fines, etc…his payment method allows customers to buy on the Internet using direct online transfers from their bank account. 

Number of transfers processed | 2006-

2006 - 4.5 million transactions 

2007 - 15 million transactions

2008 - 28 million transactions

2009 - 45.4 million transactions

2010 - 68.8 million transactions

2011 - 93.8 million transactions

2012 - 117.2 million transactions

2013 - 142.5 million transactions

2014 - 180.2 million transactions

2015 - 222 million transactions

2016 - 282 million transactions

2017 - unavailable 

2018 - unavailable

2019 - 655 million transactions 

iDeal is owned by a Dutch e-commerce powerhouses Currence and is worth one billion in 2021.

Process 

iDEAL offers merchants a real-time payment method (publicized as low-cost and virtually risk-free) to accept internet payments. For customers, iDEAL uses the same environment as their banks' online banking sites. A high level of security is realized by using two-factor authentication (2FA), such as a challenge–response access token based on the chip embedded in the debit card or ATM card. Furthermore, no sensitive information is being shared with the merchant, such as credit card numbers. There is no chargeback right, however, which can be considered a disadvantage for the consumer using this payment method. This is considered an advantage to the merchants.

iDEAL works as follows:

 Merchant offers iDEAL as payment method
 Consumer selects iDEAL and selects their bank
 Consumer is redirected to their bank's login page
 Participating bank displays transaction data
 Customer enters account number and signs the transaction digitally using a 2FA token
 Bank authorizes the transaction in real-time, deducting the amount directly from the consumer's account (if there is not enough balance, the transaction will be refused)
 Merchant received real-time confirmation of the payment by the bank
 Consumer is redirected back to the merchant page with a confirmation that the payment has been successful

Criticism 

iDEAL's payment makes use of the online banking environment of participating banks and therefore makes use of the extensive safety measures of the individual banks. While the transactions themselves are widely considered to be safe, iDEAL transactions could technically be regarded as cash payments between customers and suppliers, to which the bank is no party and offers no insurance. This means that iDEAL payments cannot be reversed when, for example, a webshop fails to deliver. If a user suspects fraud, their only option to get paid money back, is to make a case with their bank, in which the burden of proof lies with the customer and results are unsure. For purchases from untrusted suppliers, other methods of payment can have benefits. 

Although banks have been joining efforts to limit technical failures of the system, users (especially sellers) have complained about regular downtime. In 2014, the average availability of iDEAL was 99.5% for most customer banks, equivalent to 1.8 days of downtime per year.

See also 

 Payment Service Provider
 POLi Payments

References

External links
 Official website 

E-commerce in the Netherlands
Payment service providers
Financial services in the Netherlands